Chuqisa (Aymara, also spelled Choquesa) is a mountain in the Bolivian Andes which reaches a height of approximately . It is located in the La Paz Department, Loayza Province, Luribay Municipality. Chuqisa lies southwest of a village of that name and west of Janq'u Willk'i.

References 

Mountains of La Paz Department (Bolivia)